Dimitor is a mountain of Bosnia and Herzegovina.

See also 
 List of mountains in Bosnia and Herzegovina

References 

Mountains of Bosnia and Herzegovina